Anarkali is a 1958 Pakistani historical drama film, directed by Anwar Kamal Pasha and starring Noor Jehan and Sudhir in lead roles.

Based on the Urdu play of the same name by Imtiaz Ali Taj, the screenplay is written by Anwar Kamal Pasha with dialogues by Qamar Ajnalvi. The film revolves around the love of Jahangir for a slave girl Anarkali which creates a serious conflict between Prince Jahangir and his father, Mughal emperor Akbar. The film was released on 4 June 1958 and its performance was 'average' at the Box Office. Made with a budget of high production, the film is usually compared with landmark Bollywood film, Mughal-e-Azam which was also based on the same play. Film was praised for its music which was composed by Master Inayat Hussain and Rashid Attre. At Nigar Awards ceremony in 1958, it won two awards; Best Lyricist for Qateel Shifai and Best Playback Singer for Noor Jehan.

Cast 
 Noor Jehan as Nadira/ Anarkali
 Sudhir as Prince Salim
 Himalya Wala as Emperor Jalal-u-Din Mohammad Akbar
 Shamim Ara as Surayya
 Ragni as Dilaram
 Zohra Mirza as Jodha Bai
 M. Ajmal as Abu'l Fazl
 Fazal Haq as Daroga
 Bibbo
 G.N. Butt as Man Singh
 Zarif

Soundtrack

Release 
The film released on 4 June 1958. Its performance was rated as average at the box office and it had a theatrical run for 18 weeks in Karachi cinemas.

Production 
Imtiaz Ali Taj's Anārkalī was adapted as a screenplay by director Anwar Kamal Pasha for film Anarkali. In 1940s, Mohammad Afzal, better known by his stage name Himalya Wala was selected to play the character of Salim's Rajput friend, Durjan Singh in K. Asif adaptation of Taj's play (Mughal-e-Azam) but due to political turmoil and worst conditions in the country that lead to independence of Pakistan, the project was halted and he went on to star in Anarkali, after he migrated to Pakistan.

The film is compared with landmark Bollywood film Mughal-e-Azam which was also based on same play by Taj and broke all the Box office records but Anarkali could not perform remarkably at the box office and had low production budget in comparison to its rival.

Reception 
Film analysts criticized the casting of Noor Jehan as Anarkali as Jehan was in her 30's by then and chubby at that time. She nowhere resembled a young pretty female servant as is portrayed in the 1920s novel by the same name. The film music was however praised.

Awards and nominations 
 1958 - Nigar Awards - Best Lyricist - Qateel Shifai
 Best Playback Singer - Noor Jehan

References

External links 
 

1950s Urdu-language films
Pakistani historical films
Pakistani romance films
1958 films
Nigar Award winners
Pakistani black-and-white films
Urdu-language Pakistani films